Jussi Antero Saramo (born 9 July 1979 in Porvoon maalaiskunta) is a Finnish politician who serves in the Parliament of Finland for the Left Alliance at the Uusimaa constituency. He was elected to office in the 2019 Finnish parliamentary election, and served as Minister of Education while party leader Li Andersson was on maternity leave. Prior to his election to parliament, Saramo served as an executive on the board of multiple Finnish organisations including Veikkaus and Keva.

References

1979 births
Living people
People from Porvoo
Left Alliance (Finland) politicians
Members of the Parliament of Finland (2019–23)